Eucithara angiostoma is a small sea snail, a marine gastropod mollusk in the family Mangeliidae.

This is not Eucithara angiostoma Kay, 1979

Description
The length of the shell varies between 3 mm and 5 mm.

The longitudinal ribs are oblique. The transverse striae are  very fine but distinct. The inner and outer lips are both corrugated. The color of the shell is whitish, with a broad central brown band on the back of the body whorl, which when the shell is worn appears as a spot.

Distribution
This marine species occurs in the Indian Ocean (?), Polynesia, the Philippines.

References

 Pease, W. H. 1868. Synonymy of marine gastropodae inhabiting Polynesia. American 1. Conch. 4: 103-132

External links
  Tucker, J.K. 2004 Catalog of recent and fossil turrids (Mollusca: Gastropoda). Zootaxa 682:1-1295.
 
 Kilburn R.N. 1992. Turridae (Mollusca: Gastropoda) of southern Africa and Mozambique. Part 6. Subfamily Mangeliinae, section 1. Annals of the Natal Museum, 33: 461–575

angiostoma
Gastropods described in 1868